Henry "Harry" Fearnley (16 June 1935 – 12 January 2013) was a professional footballer born in Penistone, near Barnsley, Yorkshire, who played as a goalkeeper for Huddersfield Town, Oxford United and Doncaster Rovers.

In the 1965−66 season, Fearnely won a 4th Division Champions medal with Rovers.

He died on 12 January 2013, at his home in Poole, Dorset, aged 77.

References

1935 births
2013 deaths
People from Penistone
English footballers
Association football goalkeepers
English Football League players
Huddersfield Town A.F.C. players
Oxford United F.C. players
Doncaster Rovers F.C. players
Penistone Church F.C. players